Stephen Lee (born 1 October 1990) is a British ice hockey player formerly playing for Elite Ice Hockey League (EIHL) side Nottingham Panthers and the British national team, who he represented at the 2019 IIHF World Championship.

Lee previously played for Nottingham for a decade before returning to fellow EIHL side Guildford Flames in 2019.

He initially agreed to stay in Guildford for a second season in 2020, but due to ongoing coronavirus-induced uncertainty about when or if the 2020-21 Elite League season will start, Lee instead moved to the Alps Hockey League to sign for HC Pustertal Wölfe on August 30, 2020.

In May 2021, it was confirmed Lee would return to Nottingham after two years away from the club.  Sadly, his season was cut short by injury early on, and it was announced on 4 August 2022 that he wouldn't be returning to the Panthers.

Career statistics

Regular season and playoffs

References

External links

1990 births
English ice hockey defencemen
Guildford Flames players
HC Pustertal Wölfe players
Hull Stingrays players
Living people
Nottingham Panthers players
Sportspeople from Kingston upon Hull